N.M. Badusha is a producer, associate film director, production manager and an actor in the Malayalam film industry. He started his career in 2000. He did more than 100 films in the Malayalam film industry as production manager.

Career 
His first movie as a production controller was Vargam directed by M. Padmakumar in the year 2006. He completed various movies as production controller and on movies like Kettyolaanu Ente Malakha, Ayyappanum Koshiyum and Porinju Mariam Jose.

Filmography

Awards

References

External links
 Production controller badusha producing newmovie
 Malayalam filmmakers are in a great dilemma: Production controller Badusha
 പ്രൊഡക്ഷൻ കണ്‍ട്രോളര്‍ ബാദുഷ നിര്‍മാതാവാകുന്നു; നായകന്‍ ഫഹദ് ഫാസില്‍

Malayalam film producers
Indian film producers
Date of birth missing (living people)
Living people
Year of birth missing (living people)